The 2021–22 Little Rock Trojans men's basketball team represented the University of Arkansas at Little Rock in the 2021–22 NCAA Division I men's basketball season. The Trojans, led by fourth-year head coach Darrell Walker, played their home games at the Jack Stephens Center in Little Rock, Arkansas as members in the Sun Belt Conference. They finished the season 9–19, 3–11 in Sun Belt play to finish in last place. They defeated South Alabama in the first round of the Sun Belt tournament before losing to Troy in the quarterfinals.

On December 9, 2021, Little Rock announced that this was the last season for the team in the Sun Belt as they would join the Ohio Valley Conference on July 1, 2022.

Previous season
In a season limited due to the ongoing COVID-19 pandemic, the Trojans finished the 2020–21 season 11–15, 7–11 in Sun Belt play to finish in fifth place in the West Division. In the Sun Belt tournament, they were defeated by Appalachian State in the first round.

Roster

Schedule and results

|-
!colspan=12 style=| Non-conference regular season

|-
!colspan=9 style=| Sun Belt Conference regular season

|-
!colspan=12 style=| Sun Belt tournament

Source

References

Little Rock Trojans men's basketball seasons
Little Rock Trojans
Little Rock Trojans men's basketball
Little Rock Trojans men's basketball